The Melbourne Monarchs were one of the foundation members of the original (now defunct) Australian Baseball League.

History
The Monarchs had their licence revoked after the 1990–91 championship following a controversial dispute with Australia Baseball League officials.

The Monarchs were replaced in 1991 by the Melbourne Bushrangers. However the Footscray Football Club (now Western Bulldogs) purchased the Monarchs licence for the 1993 championship, In their first season back the Monarchs defeated Perth Heat 2 games to 0 at Perths home ground Parry Field to take out the 1993 ABL Championship.

See also 
Sport in Australia
Australian Baseball
Australian Baseball League (1989–1999)

External links

Australian Baseball League (1989–1999) teams
Defunct baseball teams in Australia